USS LST-974 was an  in the United States Navy. Like many of her class, she was not named and is properly referred to by her hull designation.

Construction
LST-974 was laid down on 28 November 1944, at Hingham, Massachusetts, by the Bethlehem-Hingham Shipyard; launched on 31 December 1944; and commissioned on 31 January 1945.

Service history
Following World War II, LST-974 performed occupation duty in the Far East until mid-May 1946. She was decommissioned and transferred to the United States Department of State for disposal on 14 May 1946. The ship was struck from the Navy list on 19 June 1946.

Notes

Citations

Bibliography 

Online resources

External links
 

 

LST-542-class tank landing ships
World War II amphibious warfare vessels of the United States
Ships built in Hingham, Massachusetts
1944 ships